Acalyptonotidae is a family of mites belonging to the order Trombidiformes.

Genera:
 Acalyptonotus Walter, 1911  
 Paenecalyptonotus Smith, 1976

References

Trombidiformes
Acari families